The 1987 Uganda Cup was the 13th season of the main Ugandan football Cup.

Overview
The competition has also been known as the Kakungulu Cup and was won by Kampala City Council FC who beat SC Villa 1-0 in the final.  The results are not available for the earlier rounds

Semi-finals

Final

Footnotes

External links
 Uganda - List of Cup Finals - RSSSF (Mikael Jönsson, Ian King and Hans Schöggl)

Ugandan Cup
Uganda Cup
Cup